Market Raja MBBS is 2019 Indian Tamil-language film written and directed by Saran and produced by S. Mohan. The film stars Arav in the title role in his lead film debut alongside Nikesha Patel. The music was composed by Simon K. King, while cinematography was handled by the director's younger brother, K. V. Guhan and editing by Gopi Krishna. The film released on 29 November 2019.

Cast 

 Arav as Market Raja 
 Nikesha Patel as Steffany
 Kavya Thapar as Vani Sri
 Vihaan as Chandrababu
 Nassar as Sivaji Muthaiyah, Vani Sri's father 
 Raadhika Sarathkumar as Sundari Bhai, Market Raja's mother 
 Rohini as Latha, Chandrababu's mother 
 Adithya Menon as Dasappan (Das)
 Chaams as Lawyer Vardharajan (Vardha)
 Pradeep Rawat as Manohar Singh
 Sayaji Shinde as Godfather Radha 
 Hareesh Peradi as Minister Ramdoss
 Nithin Sathya as Neelakandan 
 Munishkanth as Gunaseelan 
 Devadarshini as Kalavathy, an exorcist
 Vijaya Patti as Market Raja's grandmother
 Madhan Bob as Nagesh Babu
 "Boys" Rajan as Commissioner
 Vaiyapuri as a Demo Patient
 Shanthi Mani as Latha's assistant

Soundtrack 
The soundtrack was composed by Simon K. King, on his first association with director Saran.

Release 
Initially, the film was scheduled to release on 8 November 2019, but it was postponed due to unavoidable reasons. Later, it was announced that the film would be released worldwide on 29 November 2019.

References

External links 
 

2019 films
2010s Tamil-language films
Films directed by Saran